FC Hound Dogs is a football and futsal club from Gibraltar. They play their football in the Gibraltar Intermediate League and the Rock Cup; their Futsal team compete in the Futsal 1st Division.

FC Hound Dogs offers young footballers in Gibraltar the platform and opportunity to play football and futsal. The club operates a strict rotation policy where the focus is on giving everyone game time.

History

Formation
The club was founded in the summer of 2012 by Chris Gomez, Carl Bradford, David Bradford and Ercan Mehmet. The four of them set up the club from scratch, and later added Tyrone Smith to the backroom staff for the 2013–14 season. Chris and Tyrone had both been involved in coaching youth football for many years in Gibraltar, and as a result, had a group of young players interested in signing for them.

The vast majority of this group of players had been involved with Chris and Tyrone at Lions Gibraltar F.C., and later SJ Corinthians where they played alongside Ercan during the 2011–12 season and gained invaluable experience playing in the Gibraltar Premier Division. When SJ Corinthians folded at the end of the 2011–12 season, these young players had no club to play for, and as a result FC Hound Dogs was born.

After raising money via the players and founder members they were able to register and enter a football team into Gibraltar Second Division for the 2012–13 season; sponsorship was later secured via the Calpe Hounds Public House. The club started positively in their first season, finishing 4th.

After UEFA membership
The ascension of the Gibraltar Football Association to membership of UEFA led to a lot more money coming into football on the Rock, and as such, results began to decline for Hound Dogs with lower end of season finishes following in the coming seasons, although the club did provide a platform for young players such as Nick Castle, Etien Victory, Jamie Fortuna and Alan Wszeberowski to move to bigger clubs. Co-founder Ercan "Urge" Mehmet left the club in 2017, with a testimonial played in June that year.

However, results and finances continued to lag behind the rest of the pack, and in 2019 Hound Dogs withdrew from the newly formed Gibraltar National League, earning special dispensation to play in the Gibraltar Intermediate League along with U23 sides from other clubs in Gibraltar.

Current staff

Current football squad

Retired numbers

 (posthumous honour)

References

External links 
 Official Website
 
 

Football clubs in Gibraltar
Futsal clubs in Gibraltar
2012 establishments in Gibraltar
Association football clubs established in 2012